Von Olfers is a surname, and refers to the following people:

 Hedwig von Olfers, child of Ignaz von Olfers and spouse of Heinrich Abeken
 Ignaz von Olfers (1793–1871), German naturalist, historian, and diplomat
 Marie von Olfers (1826–1924), German writer, illustrator, and salonnière
 Sibylle von Olfers (1881–1916), German art teacher, nun, author, and illustrator

See also
 Steve Olfers (b. 1982), Dutch former footballer